Brett Hildabrand (March 3, 1981) was a Republican member of the Kansas House of Representatives representing the 17th District which includes Lake Quivira, Lenexa and Shawnee Kansas. Hildabrand's first term began in January 2011. In 2004, he earned a B.S. in Animal Science from Kansas State University. He currently works in the freight logistics and transportation field.

Issue positions
On his website Hildabrand lists his legislative goals as "Job Growth and Small Business Development, Protection of Personal Liberties and Freedoms, Reducing State Spending, Quality Education, Defending the Second Amendment and Protecting the Right to Life."

Committee membership
 Federal and State Affairs Committee
 Corrections and Juvenile Justice
 Transportation & Public Safety Budget, Vice-Chair

References

External links 
 www.Brett4Kansas.com
 Kansas Legislature
 Kansas Legislature Standing Committees
 Kansas Legislature Member Profiles

People from Fort Scott, Kansas
Republican Party members of the Kansas House of Representatives
Living people
21st-century American politicians
People from Shawnee, Kansas
1981 births
Kansas State University alumni